was the highest government post of the Ryūkyū Kingdom below the king; the sessei served the function of royal or national advisor. In the Ryukyuan language at the time, the pronunciation was closer to shisshii, and has only changed relatively recently. Though the same Chinese characters which compose the modern Okinawan word sessei are read as sesshō in Japanese, the position is not quite the same, and the Ryukyuan post is not derived from the Japanese model or system.

The sessei worked alongside the king and the Sanshikan (Council of Three) to draft and enact laws, though the king gradually became more and more of a figurehead over the course of the period when Ryūkyū was a subsidiary of the Japanese feudal domain of Satsuma (1609–1870s). Like most Ryukyuan government officials at the time, most sessei were appointed from the elite class of yukatchu, scholars of Chinese subjects from the town of Kumemura.

The three men who held the position of sessei during the first Shō Dynasty of Ryukyuan kings were Chinese, but beginning with the Second Shō Dynasty, sessei were native Ryukyuans. Royal officials, sometimes princes, would select the sessei, and the appointment would come with an appropriate rank and title, often that of "prince", despite the sessei being in essence a bureaucrat and not royalty himself. It was not uncommon for such a title to be conferred upon anyone who performed great service to the kingdom, though right of succession and other such royal rights implied by the title of "prince" did not accompany such an honor.

While most sessei essentially played the role of a bureaucrat and privileged member of the royal entourage, Shō Shōken, who held the post from 1666 to 1673, is particularly known for acting as a lawmaker, issuing a great many important and beneficial reforms during his short tenure.

List of sessei

References

Smits, Gregory (1999). Visions of Ryukyu: Identity and Ideology in Early-Modern Thought and Politics. Honolulu: University of Hawai'i Press.

External links
中山王府相卿伝職年譜　向祐等著写本